The World Indoor Games were arranged by the IAAF and held at the Palais Omnisports Paris-Bercy in Paris, France, from January 18 to January 19, 1985. In 1987 the championship was renamed to the IAAF World Indoor Championships and gained official status. There were a total number of 319 participating athletes from 69 countries.

Results

Men

Women

Medals table

Participating nations

 (1)
 (2)
 (6)
 (2)
 (2)
 (2)
 (1)
 (7)
 (5)
 (6)
 (10)
 (2)
 (9)
 (2)
 (2)
 (8)
 (10)
 (3)
 (2)
 (6)
 (2)
 (3)
 (25)
 (16)
 (3)
 (2)
 (4)
 (2)
 (2)
 (2)
 (2)
 (1)
 (19)
 (2)
 (1)
 (5)
 (1)
 (1)
 (5)
 (2)
 (5)
 (4)
 (4)
 (5)
 (7)
 (1)
 (2)
 (2)
 (8)
 (2)
 (2)
 (2)
 (7)
 (3)
 (2)
 (2)
 (16)
 (9)
 (2)
 (4)
 (7)
 (2)
 (2)
 (2)
 (1)
 (1)
 (22)
 (5)
 (1)

See also
 1985 in athletics (track and field)

References

Results (archived)

 
IAAF World Indoor Games
IAAF World Indoor Games
World Athletics Indoor Championships
International athletics competitions hosted by France
January 1985 sports events in Europe
International sports competitions hosted by Paris
1985 in Paris